Rosetta Gagliardi (9 February 1895 – 31 July 1975) was an Italian tennis player. She competed at the 1920 Summer Olympics and the 1924 Summer Olympics.

References

External links
 

1895 births
1975 deaths
Italian female tennis players
Olympic tennis players of Italy
Tennis players at the 1920 Summer Olympics
Tennis players at the 1924 Summer Olympics
Tennis players from Milan
20th-century Italian women